21st Indiana Battery Light Artillery was an artillery battery that served in the Union Army during the American Civil War.

Service
The battery was organized at Indianapolis, Indiana and mustered in September 9, 1862, for a three-year enlistment under the command of Captain William W. Andrew.

The battery was attached to 2nd Division, Army of Kentucky, Department of the Ohio, October 1862. Unassigned, Army of Kentucky, Department of the Ohio, to December 1862. Artillery, 3rd Division, Army of Kentucky, Department of the Ohio, to February 1863. Crook's Brigade, Baird's Division, Army of Kentucky, Department of the Cumberland, to June 1863. Artillery, 4th Division, XIV Corps, Army of the Cumberland, to October 1863. 2nd Division, Artillery Reserve, Department of the Cumberland, to March 1864. Garrison Artillery, Columbia, Tennessee, Department of the Cumberland, to November 1864. Garrison Artillery, Nashville, Tennessee, Department of the Cumberland, to March 1865. 2nd Sub-District, District of Middle Tennessee, Department of the Cumberland, to June 1865.

The 21st Indiana Battery Light Artillery mustered out of service on June 26, 1865.

Detailed service
Left Indiana for Covington, Kentucky, September 9. Duty at Lexington, Richmond, Danville, and Louisville, Kentucky, until February 2, 1863. Ordered to Nashville, Tennessee, February 2; then moved to Carthage, Tennessee, and duty there until June. Moved to Murfreesboro June 3. Tullahoma Campaign June 23-July 7. Hoover's Gap June 24–26. Occupation of middle Tennessee until August 16. Passage of the Cumberland Mountains and Tennessee River and Chickamauga Campaign August 16-September 22. Catlett's Gap, Pigeon Mountain, September 15–18. Battle of Chickamauga September 19–21. Siege of Chattanooga, Tenn., September 24-November 23. Battles of Chattanooga November 23–25. Duty at Chattanooga until March 26, 1864, and at Columbia, Tennessee, until November 24. Moved to Nashville, Tennessee, November 24. Battle of Nashville December 15–16. Garrison duty at Nashville until June 1865.

Casualties
The battery lost a total of 28 men during service; 4 enlisted men killed or mortally wounded, 24 enlisted men died of disease.

Commanders
 Captain William W. Andrew
 Captain Abram Piatt Andrew
 Lieutenant William E. Chess - commanded during the Chattanooga Campaign

See also

 List of Indiana Civil War regiments
 Indiana in the Civil War

References
 Andrew, Abram Piatt. Some Civil War Letters of A. Piatt Andrew (Gloucester, MA: Privately printed), 1925.
 Dyer, Frederick H. A Compendium of the War of the Rebellion (Des Moines, IA: Dyer Pub. Co.), 1908.
Attribution
 

Military units and formations established in 1862
Military units and formations disestablished in 1865
Units and formations of the Union Army from Indiana
1862 establishments in Indiana
Artillery units and formations of the American Civil War
1865 disestablishments in Indiana